"Pressure Point" is a song by The Zutons. It was the first single to be released from their debut album Who Killed...... The Zutons?. During the music video, a number of chaotic incidents occur around the musicians, including a hanging dress, a cat and its milk, the flow of the milk, and the billboard. At the end, the billboard collapses, making it look like the musicians are dead, but they still sing and tap their feet.

The music video was used in the PSP demo disk, the single was featured in several Levi's commercials in 2004 and 2005, and in the EA Sports video game MVP Baseball 2005.

The single peaked at #19 on the UK Singles Chart in January 2005 and was the band's first chart appearance.

To date, "Pressure Point" is the band's only chart hit in the United States, peaking at number 29 on the Billboard Hot Modern Rock Tracks chart in 2005.

Track listing

CD Version
 Pressure Point
 Beggars And Choosers

Limited CD2 Version
 Pressure Point
 Over The Hill
 Zuton Fever (Acoustic Version)
 Pressure Point (Video)

7" Version
 Pressure Point
 Zutonkhamuun

References

The Zutons songs
2004 singles
2004 songs